Super Saucy is the second studio album (and sixth album overall) by American hip hop recording artist by Baby Bash. It was released on March 15, 2005, with the record label Universal Records before signing with Arista Records.

Singles 
"Baby, I'm Back" was released on February 21, 2005, as the first single from the album. The song features guest vocals from R&B singer Akon. The song was a commercial success, peaking at number nineteen on the Billboard Hot 100 and number nine on the Hot Rap Songs chart. The song was certified gold by the Recording Industry Association of America (RIAA), for selling 500,000 copies.

Reception

Critical response

Steve 'Flash' Juon of RapReviews praised the production contributions from Happy Perez, Akon, Block of Rock and Fredwreck, and Bash's simplistic delivery of wordplay that shows "not only attention to detail but paint cinematic pictures as he casually flows along", saying that "he's not only made it his own but he's made it to the upper echelons of the pop charts without having to trade in his style - radio and video just latched onto it when they were finally hip to it. Hopefully they're hip to Super Saucy too - it's his best album since 2003 and has all the potential to keep dropping more and more hits year-round". AllMusic's David Jeffries called the record "a party alternative to Nephew", praising Perez's "busy, hooked-filled, Texas magic on numerous tracks" and Bash himself for "adding some much needed freshness to the tired crooner/rapper combo", concluding that "with so much well-done good-time music, the crowd-pleasing Super Saucy is worth considering and generally 'bubbalicious'."

Commercial performance
Super Saucy debuted on the US Billboard 200 chart at number 11, with first week sales of 48,000 copies, becoming Baby Bash's highest charting album to date.

Track listing

Sample credits
"No Way Jose" samples "I Ain't Got Time Anymore" by The Glass Bottle

Chart history

References

External links

2005 albums
Baby Bash albums
Albums produced by Akon
Universal Records albums
Albums produced by Happy Perez